Jerry Jackson may refer to:

People
 Jerry Jackson (footballer), the oldest player in see Sheffield Wednesday F.C. records
 Jerry Jackson (wrestler), an American wrestler at the 1995 Pan American Games
 Jerry Jackson (choreographer), choreographer for the musical Seven Brides for Seven Brothers
 Jerry Jackson, the mayor of Harrison, Arkansas

Arts and entertainment
Jerry Jackson, a fictional character in The Wicked Lady
Jerry Jackson, an animation series by David Firth
"Jerry Jackson", a song on the 1983 soundtrack album The Wicked Lady

See also
 Jerome Jackson (disambiguation)
 Jeremy Jackson (disambiguation)
 Jeremiah Jackson
 Gerald Jackson, an NCIS character